Ipanema is a monotypic genus of crustaceans belonging to the monotypic family Ipanemidae. The only species is Ipanema talpa.

The species is found in Southern America.

References

Amphipoda